Spark: A Burning Man Story is a 2013 independent documentary film with its world premiere at the South by Southwest film festival (SXSW) in Austin, Texas.  That is about some 60,000 or so people that gather from around the world for a week at the annual Burning Man festival in Black Rock Desert of Nevada to collaborate building a temporary city that operates on a "gifting" economy where nothing is bought or sold.  Participants bring in everything; food, water, and shelter.  The week features large-scale art installations and partying, at the conclusion of the week a celebration in the ritual burning of a giant effigy, and after one week, take it all away.

The film also focuses on the individual artists and their dreams and struggles. The Burning Man organization is made up of 50 year-round staff and over 4,000 volunteers. Burning Man operates on ten principles or ideologies written by founder Larry Harvey.

Awards 
Official Selection, Ashland Independent Film Festival, 2013
Official Selection, Seattle International Film Festival, 2013

Critics reviews 
The film has appeared in the following critics reviews:

Soundtrack 
 Disc 1
 "Feel the Love" by Rudimental ft. John Newman
 "Heroes" by Cazzette
 "Coastal Brake" by Tycho
 "The Event" by Marcus Andersson / Alex Talan
 "Dubstep Dark" by Scoredraw
 "Let it Fo" by Michael Franti / Spearhead
 "We Ride" by Missy Higgins
 "Man On Fire" by Edward Sharpe and the Magnetic Zeros
 "Wave" by Crystal Fighters
 "Going to the Desert" by Mathew Jonson / Damian Lazarus
 "In My Mind" by Amanda Palmer
 "Quietly Happy" by Scoredraw

 Disc 2
 "Flutes" [Sasha Remix] by Hot Chip
 "Running" by The Scumfrog
 "Let it Go"  [Stanton Warriors Remix]  by Michael Franti
 "Time" by Pachanga Boys
 "Summit" by Colombo
 "Express Yourself" by Diplo
 "One Type of Dark"  [Ta-Ku Remix]  by Ginger & the Ghost
 "Man On Fire"  [Adam Freeland Remix]  by Edward Sharpe & the Magnetic Zeros
 "Principles" by Benoit & Sergio
 "Scorpion Frog" by Infected Mushroom
 "Clubbing" by Colombo
 "Promised Land" by Joe Smooth

References

External links 
 Spark: A Burning Man Story(2013) on the Internet Movie Database
 

American documentary films
2013 documentary films
American independent films
Documentary films about Burning Man
Films shot in Nevada
2013 independent films
2013 films
2010s English-language films
2010s American films